Cyp6g1 or DDT-R is an insecticide resistance gene for resistance to DDT in Drosophila melanogaster. It belongs to the cytochrome P450 family and is located in chromosome 2R. Following up their earlier work, Daborn et al 2002 find the DDT-R gene induces overtranscription of Cyp6g1, of which there are 4 duplicates. They also find several substrates of Cyp6g1, namely DDT, lufenuron, and nitenpyram.

References

External links 
 FlyBase Gene Report: Dmel\Cyp6g1 at FlyBase database of Drosophila genes.

6
Drosophila melanogaster genes
DDT
EC 1.14